Reckless Roads is a 1935 American drama film directed by Burt P. Lynwood and starring Judith Allen, Regis Toomey and Lloyd Hughes.

Cast
 Judith Allen as Edith Adams  
 Regis Toomey as Speed Demming  
 Lloyd Hughes as Fred Truslow  
 Ben Alexander as Wade Adams  
 Louise Carter as Mrs. Adams  
 Gilbert Emery as Amos Truslow  
 Matthew Betz 
 Dorothea Wolbert
 Kit Guard
 Jock Hutton

References

Bibliography
 Palmer, Scott. British Film Actors' Credits, 1895-1987. McFarland, 1988.

External links
 

1935 films
1935 drama films
1930s English-language films
American black-and-white films
Majestic Pictures films
Films directed by Burt P. Lynwood
1930s American films